The Piece Maker 2 is the second studio album by Tony Touch, released on February 24, 2004 through Koch Records.

Background
The album was a "sequel" to Tony Touch's 2000 debut, The Piece Maker, which became a minor hit on the Billboard charts. The Piece Maker 2 followed the same format as the original with Touch rapping his own lyrics with several guest artists, including P. Diddy, Fat Joe and members of the Wu-Tang Clan. Touch also produced 12 of the album's 19 tracks, with additional production from prominent hip hop producers such as Erick Sermon and Pete Rock. One charting single was produced from the album "Ay Ay Ay" which featured Sean Paul.  It spent 15 weeks on the Hot R&B/Hip-Hop Songs chart, peaking at No, 77.

Reception

David Jeffries af Allmusic gave the album three stars out of a possible five. He praised "Trouble on the Westside", "Ay Ay Ay" and "Capicu", as well as the album's skits, saying "it's all blended so well the album feels more effortless than ambitious". He also stated "the album's biggest problem, and one wishes the producer had come up with that extra track that would have turned Piece Maker, Vol. 2 into a classic. But for a casual and languid ride through the downtown, you can always turn to Touch."

The album was not a success on the Billboard charts and unlike the first Piece Maker album, did not sell enough copies to qualify for the Billboard 200. It peaked at No. 53 on the Top R&B/Hip-Hop Albums and No. 12 on the Top Independent Albums. As of June 2005, the album has sold over 31,000 copies.

Track listing

Charts

References

2004 albums
E1 Music albums
Albums produced by Domingo (producer)
Albums produced by Erick Sermon
Albums produced by Pete Rock
Albums produced by RZA
Sequel albums